Jamil Joseph (born 17 January 1991) is a Saint Lucian international footballer who plays club football for Vieux Fort South of the Saint Lucia Silver Division.

Career

Club
Joseph has played club football in Saint Lucia for Vieux Fort South and in England for Thackley. In 2012, he, along with fellow-Saint Lucian Eden Charles, trialed at Carlisle United FC of League One as part of an agreement between the Saint Lucia Football Association and the club.

International
He made his international debut for Saint Lucia on July 8, 2011 in a 2014 FIFA World Cup qualification match against Aruba.

International goals 
Scores and results list Saint Lucia's goal tally first. Excludes "non-official" international goals.

References

1991 births
Living people
Saint Lucian footballers
Saint Lucia international footballers
Thackley F.C. players
W Connection F.C. players
Association football forwards
Saint Lucian expatriate footballers
Expatriate footballers in England
Saint Lucian expatriate sportspeople in England
Expatriate footballers in Trinidad and Tobago
Saint Lucian expatriate sportspeople in Trinidad and Tobago